Daniel Gürschner (born February 27, 1973) is a German judoka.

Achievements

References

External links
 

1973 births
Living people
German male judoka
Judoka at the 2000 Summer Olympics
Olympic judoka of Germany
20th-century German people
21st-century German people